The Odd Fellows Temple in Pasadena, California is a historic building that was built in 1933 at 175 N. Los Robles Ave. The temple served as a meeting place for Odd Fellow Lodge No. 324, the Pasadena branch of the Independent Order of Odd Fellows established in 1885. Pasadena architect Kenneth Gordon designed the building; its design incorporates the Spanish Colonial Revival and Mediterranean Revival styles. The temple is the only Spanish Colonial Revival building in Pasadena which was built for a fraternal organization. It was listed on the National Register of Historic Places (NRHP) in 1985.

It is a large building but was nonetheless moved in 1987, after its NRHP listing, to 120 N. El Molino Avenue.

References

External links

Odd Fellows buildings in California
Buildings and structures on the National Register of Historic Places in Pasadena, California
Buildings and structures completed in 1933
Buildings and structures in Pasadena, California
Spanish Colonial Revival architecture in California
Clubhouses on the National Register of Historic Places in California